Bastiaan "Bas" Maliepaard (born 3 April 1938) is a retired Dutch cyclist who was active between 1959 and 1967. He won the Ronde van Overijssel (1959), Omloop der Kempen (1959) and the points classification in the 1963 Vuelta a España, as well as the bronze medal in the road race at the 1959 UCI Road World Championships.

References

1938 births
Living people
Dutch male cyclists
People from Moerdijk
UCI Road World Championships cyclists for the Netherlands
Cyclists from North Brabant